Battle of Placentia may refer to:

 Battle of Placentia (217 BC), fought between the Roman Republic and the Punics
 Battle of Placentia (194 BC), fought between the Roman Republic and the Boii
 Battle of Placentia (69), fought between forces of the Emperor Otho and his opponent Vitellius
 Battle of Placentia (271), fought Between the Roman Empire and the Juthungi
 Battle of Placentia (456), fought between forces of the Emperor Avitus and his opponent Ricimer
 Battle of Placentia (1692), fought between the English and the French in Placentia, Newfoundland
 Battle of Piacenza (1746), fought between the Franco-Spanish and Austria